The Berlinka ('Berliner'), also depozyt berliński and skarb pruski ('Prussian Treasure'), is the Polish name for a collection of German original manuscripts originally kept at the Prussian State Library in Berlin, which since the end of World War II are held by the Jagiellonian Library in Kraków. The legal status of the documents is subject of an ongoing debate.

History
During the Second World War from September 1942 onwards, German authorities moved the material from Berlin to the seized abbey of Grüssau (present-day Krzeszów) in Prussian Lower Silesia, in order to protect it from Allied strategic bombing. When the Lower Silesian territory east of the Oder–Neisse line fell under the administrative sovereignty of the Republic of Poland after the war, the Polish government secretly claimed the collection as war reparations. In the winter of 1945–1946, the inventories were removed by Polish milicja and thereafter transferred to Kraków.

In 1965, the Polish and the East German government signed an agreement on the return of large collections of the Prussian State Library; however, the Polish authorities kept the Berlinka's existence at the Jagiellonian Library a secret until 1977, when Polish First Secretary Edward Gierek presenting his East German counterpart Erich Honecker with seven pieces of sheet music, including Mozart's original score of The Magic Flute and Beethoven's notes for his Symphony No. 9, as a gift.

Debate
Since the jurisdiction of the former eastern territories of Germany was withdrawn by the 1945 Potsdam Agreement, Poland claims that it should retain ownership of the Berlinka as compensation for Polish cultural assets destroyed or looted by Germans during the Second World War; the total worth of Polish cultural heritage destroyed by Nazi Germany, especially after the failed Warsaw Uprising in 1944, is estimated at 20 billion dollars. Some German media have referred to the Berlinka as the "last German prisoner of war". The German government claims that Poland is in violation of Article 56 of the Hague Convention of 1907, while the Polish side emphasizes the fact that the collections were not looted, but were situated on Polish territory after the war.

After the Revolutions of 1989, the Polish–German Treaty of Good Neighbourship was signed in 1991 and several negotiations have taken place in order to clarify and confirm the whereabouts of the Berlinka. Poland has undertaken several initiatives, such as in 2000 when Foreign Minister Władysław Bartoszewski proposed establishing a Polish–German foundation that would take possession of such disputed collections. However, the German government refused – according to Bartoszewski, resulting from the fact that Chancellor Gerhard Schröder did not realise the offer. While Germany each time is demanding that Poland return the Berlinka unconditionally, Poland refuses, claiming that Germany still has much Polish material looted during World War II, and that this should be returned to Poland in exchange.

In summer 2007, Der Spiegel magazine quoted German Foreign Office representative Julia Gross as saying that proceedings over the disposition had reached a low point. Earlier, Poland had stated that return is out of the question. In 2014 Germany returned to Poland the painting Schody pałacowe (English: Palace Stairs) by Francesco Guardi, which had been looted by Germans from the National Museum, Warsaw in 1939. With this gesture, Germany hoped to restart negotiations for the return of Berlinka.

Contents

The Berlinka comprises some of the most valuable holdings of the former Prussian State Library. It includes over 500,000 medieval manuscripts, early modern printings and autographs, including by Luther and Calvin, Goethe and Schiller, Hegel, and Herder. Among the holdings are notable letters from the large estate of Ludmilla Assing and her uncle Karl August Varnhagen von Ense, personal copies of the Deutsches Wörterbuch with hand-written notes by the Brothers Grimm and original musical scores by Johann Sebastian Bach (and his sons), Mozart (Die Entführung aus dem Serail), Beethoven, Schubert, Brahms, Schumann, Haydn, Mendelssohn-Bartholdy, Paganini, Busoni, Cherubini, and Telemann. On the other hand, the collections also comprise many manuscripts and incunables from Polish monasteries in Gniezno, Lubiń, Mogilno, Pakość, Paradyż, Pelplin and Poznań, removed between 1820 and 1840 by Prussian authorities from the territories gained in the Partitions of Poland.

Listed under separate provenance, the collections today are accessible for researchers and post-graduate students only. After a number of incunables from the Jagiellonian Library were found at auctions, user conditions were tightened again in 1999.

See also 
Baldin Collection
Destruction of Warsaw
Nazi plunder
World War II looting of Poland
Załuski Library

References

External links 
 Staatsbibliothek zu Berlin website
  Berlin, Berlinka i bierna Warszawa, Gazeta Wyborcza, 2007-08-11
  Czy oddamy Bibliotekę Pruską? , Gazeta Wyborcza, 2001-09-12

Art and cultural repatriation after World War II
German culture
Documents
Archives in Poland
Germany–Poland relations